This cultivar should not be confused with the American species Ulmus alata, commonly known as the 'Winged Elm.

The elm cultivar Ulmus 'Alata'''' was first mentioned by Kirchner, in Petzold & Kirchner,  Arboretum Muscaviense 566, 1864, as Ulmus montana (: glabra) alata, but without description.

Description
Considered possibly a juvenile form of Ulmus carpinifolia (: minor)''.

Cultivation
No specimens are known to survive.

References

Ulmus articles missing images
Elm cultivars
Missing elm cultivars